Enn Uuetoa (also known as Kihnu Jõnn; 1848–1913) was a notorious Estonian ship captain.

Uuetoa was born on the island of Kihnu. He was known as a ship captain who was able to command large ships without the use of either a compass or a sextant. He never had single accident with his ships. He also used to go to the sea when other captains don't dare to go.

However, in autumn 1913 he sunk with his ship called Rock City when sailing off the coast of Denmark.

In popular culture
In 1971, the film Metskapten (director Kalju Komissarov) was made. The role of Kihnu Jõnn was played by Jüri Järvet.

References

Further reading
 Theodor Saar. "Kihnu Jõnn ehk ühe legendi sünd". Keel ja Kirjandus 1971, nr 8, pp 477–483, and nr 10, pp 609–613; Addendum – Keel ja Kirjandus 1972, nr 3, p 192

1848 births
1913 deaths
Sea captains
Estonian sailors
People from Kihnu Parish